The 2021 Judo Grand Slam Tbilisi was held at the Tbilisi Sports Palace in Tbilisi, Georgia from 26 to 28 March 2021.

Medal summary

Medal table

Men's events

Source Results

Women's events

Source Results

Event videos
The event was air freely on the IJF YouTube channel.

References

External links
 

2021 IJF World Tour
2021 Judo Grand Slam
Grand Slam 2021
Judo
Judo
Judo
Judo